Elymia was a town of ancient Arcadia, on the confines of Mantineia and Orchomenus.

Its site is located east of the modern village of Levidi, where ancient remains were discovered.

References

Populated places in ancient Arcadia
Former populated places in Greece